Fiona Xie (谢婉谕, Xie Wanyu; born 24 January 1982) is a Singaporean actress, variety show host, and was named as one of the Seven Princesses of Mediacorp in 2006, only the most famous of young actresses in Singapore could hold that honour. She was prominently a full-time Mediacorp artiste from 2001 to 2009. Xie is one of the Singaporean actresses to break into Hollywood, playing Kitty Pong in the 2018 film Crazy Rich Asians. Xie is slated to play the same role in its sequel China Rich Girlfriend based on the 2015 international best-selling novel of the same name by Kevin Kwan.

Career
Xie was spotted by a talent scout at the age of 15 while studying in St. Hilda's Secondary School. She modelled for numerous print and television commercials in Singapore and Hong Kong before joining MediaCorp as a full-time artiste in 2001.

Xie made her acting debut as a nurse in the Channel 5 drama Growing Up. Her convincing acting landed her one of her most recognisable roles in the Channel 8 sitcom My Genie. She won "Best Newcomer" at the Star Awards 2001 after joining the entertainment industry for just over a year.

Xie later become known for her talents as a bilingual variety show hostess, in particular of the long-running series City Beat. She has since hosted other variety shows, such as the photography-based Say Cheez for Channel 8, and introducing celebrities' favourite hawker foods in Coffee Talk and Hawker Woks for Channel 5. She also hosted the travel show Weekend Escapade together with Ben Yeo.

In 2004, Xie ran with Jeanette Aw, Joyce Chao and Felicia Chin, dressed only in bikinis, along Orchard Road for the Channel 8 drama The Champion.

In 2005, Xie was voted as sexiest woman for the "FHM Top 100 Sexiest Women Singapore" list, even though she had never posed for FHM before. She continued to be ranked among the Top 10 for the FHM lists in the next 3 years.

In 2006, Xie attempted her first villain role as a spoilt diamond heiress in the Channel 8 drama An Enchanted Life, starring alongside Yvonne Lim and Pierre Png. In December 2006, Xie was identified as one of the most promising young actresses in the Singapore entertainment industry by leading local entertainment magazine I-Weekly.

In 2007, Xie took part in the second season of the Singapore edition of Deal or No Deal, where her winnings would go to a selected charity organisation. The episode aired on 22 November 2007.

Xie appeared in her second film project, Rule #1, directed by Kelvin Tong. The film also starred Hong Kong actors Ekin Cheng and Shawn Yue, and debuted in Singapore and Malaysia on 13 March 2008.

Xie starred in a MediaCorp Channel 8 drama Just in Singapore, which was telecast in March 2008. She played a kind-hearted tomboy who sells chicken wings at bazaars and sings getai during the Hungry Ghost Festival.

Xie starred in a Channel 5 sitcom titled Calefare, which starred Gurmit Singh, Benjamin Heng, Mastura Ahmad and Vadi PVSS. She played a calafare (a Singaporean slang term for a background actor or extra) named Joleen Wee, a wannabe singer who actually cannot sing, and often spouts phrases like "eyes wide open", "laugh out loud" and so on.

Xie was originally slated to star in MediaCorp Channel 8's 2009 blockbuster drama, Together. She would have played the second female lead role, one of the meatiest roles that she would have ever received in her career. It was announced on 15 July 2009 that she pulled out of the series due to private matters. This move hogged the news headlines once again, which was perceived to be a sudden disappearance and publicity stunt. Although the exact reason behind her pulling out of the series was never revealed, several colleagues hinted to the media that Xie had expressed discomfort in taking up this role before filming commenced. Eelyn Kok eventually replaced Xie in Together.

Xie went on to play the lead role in her third film Fist of Dragon, also a Singaporean production.

Xie left the entertainment industry in 2009, citing personal reasons. Thereafter she travelled extensively across the globe, living in cities including Hong Kong, New York City, Shanghai and most recently Tokyo. On 2 September 2009, Channel NewsAsia carried news reports that Xie had quit MediaCorp, but this was later disputed by another news article.

On 6 December 2009, Xie was the main feature for top-selling magazines 8 Days and I-weekly. In the interview, she confirmed that she was indeed leaving MediaCorp and revealed her reasons. In an interview with MediaCorp's artiste management unit, the TV station expressed optimism in working with Xie in the future. Her last drama with Mediacorp was Serves You Right!

She then hosted a variety show, Lodge with Me (我行我宿), which aired in May 2010, alongside Felicia Chin, Rui En, and Zhou Ying.

After a 7-year hiatus, she returned to Singapore to film Left Behind, a MediaCorp series slated to be released in August 2016. Xie plays a psychiatrist in her new drama, which she says the role's tribulations is a personal reflection of her own life in recent years. In various media interviews, Xie was cited as saying she wanted to spend more time with her family, especially with one of her cousins who was critically ill, as one major reason for returning to Singapore.
 
Xie costarred in the Warner Bros. film Crazy Rich Asians, starring Constance Wu and Henry Golding. The film was her Hollywood debut.

She worked once on both the English-language Channel 5 and Chinese-language Channel 8 and was once popularly referred to as the head princess of the Seven Princesses of Mediacorp because of her immense popularity in the industry with Rui En, Jeanette Aw, Felicia Chin, Jesseca Liu, Joanne Peh & Dawn Yeoh. She also endorsed products such as Gong Cha's juices and OSIM's massage devices.

In 2018, Xie made a comeback on Mandarin television. Xie starred alongside Elvin Ng, Zhang Yaodong, Tong Bingyu, and Dawn Yeoh in Gifted, a crime thriller filmed in Malaysia. She plays an accomplished businesswoman who is also "a very powerful, very scary lady who will go to great lengths to make sure that she gets what she wants".

Filmography

Films

Television

Variety

Awards and nominations

References

External links

Fiona Xie's Official Facebook Page

Singaporean television actresses
Singaporean film actresses
Singaporean people of Teochew descent
1982 births
Singaporean television personalities
Living people